Buzz Caner is an album by Chaos A.D., an alias of Squarepusher (Tom Jenkinson). Instead of Squarepusher's unusual drum and bass sound, this album uses a more techno-based acid house sound.

Track listing

CD

3×12" vinyl
Side A
"Thin Life"
"Messhead"
Side B
"Bioslate"
"Generation Shit"
Side C
"Dreaded Pestilence"
"Mind War Electro"
Side D
"Friend Track"
"Psultan Part 1"
Side E
"Theme From Cumberland Wrestling"
"Male Pill Part 6"
Side F
"Up the Gary"
"Davey's Safety Lamp"

References

1998 albums
Squarepusher albums